Nikolai Portelli (born 17 December 1981) is a Maltese athlete. He competed in the 200 meters at the 2008 Olympic Games failing to qualify for the second round. He finished 8th in Heat 4 with a time of 22.31 seconds.

External links
 
Nikolai Portelli - IAAF.org Profile

1981 births
Living people
Maltese male sprinters
Athletes (track and field) at the 2008 Summer Olympics
Olympic athletes of Malta
World Athletics Championships athletes for Malta
Athletes (track and field) at the 2009 Mediterranean Games
Mediterranean Games competitors for Malta